The House of Bethlen is the name of two Hungarian ancient noble families, Bethlen de Iktár and Bethlen de Bethlen. Although they have similar coat of arms, those two families don't have proven mutual ancestry. Both can trace their noble lineage up to 12th and 13th century and their family members played significant role in the history of Transylvania and Hungary.

Notable members 
Bethlen, son of Lőrinc, Hungarian nobleman, ancestor of the Bethlen and Apafi families
András Bethlen de Bethlen (1847–1898), Hungarian Count who served as Hungarian Minister of Agriculture (1890–1894)
Gabriel Bethlen de Iktár (1580–1629), Prince of Transylvania (1613–1629), Duke of Opole (1622–1625) and leader of an anti-Habsburg insurrection
Katharina Bethlen de Iktár (1604–1649), Princess of Transylvania (1629–1630)
Stephan Bethlen de Iktár (1582–1648), Prince of Transylvania in 1630
István Bethlen de Bethlen (1874–1946), Hungarian Count and statesman who served as Prime Minister of Hungary (1921–1931)
János Bethlen de Bethlen (1613–1678), Hungarian aristocrat who served as Chancellor of Transylvania from 1659 to 1678
Farkas Bethlen de Bethlen (1639–1679), Hungarian Count who inherited his cousin as Chancellor of Transylvania from 1678 to 1679
Katalin Bethlen de Bethlen (1700–1759) Hungarian aristocrat and author
Theodora, Countess Nikolaus Bethlen de Bethlen (b. 1986), German aristocrat

Bethlen is also the German and Hungarian name for Beclean, a town in Bistriţa-Năsăud County, Romania, while Betlen is the Hungarian and a German name for Beclean, a commune in Braşov County, Romania.

See also
List of titled noble families in the Kingdom of Hungary

References

 
Hungarian noble families